Brian Conrad (born November 20, 1970) is an American mathematician and number theorist, working at Stanford University. Previously, he taught at the University of Michigan and at Columbia University.

Conrad and others proved the modularity theorem, also known as the Taniyama-Shimura Conjecture. He proved this in 1999 with Christophe Breuil, Fred Diamond and Richard Taylor, while holding a joint postdoctoral position at Harvard University and the Institute for Advanced Study in Princeton, New Jersey.

Conrad received his bachelor's degree from Harvard in 1992, where he won a prize for his undergraduate thesis. He did his doctoral work under Andrew Wiles and went on to receive his Ph.D. from Princeton University in 1996 with a dissertation titled Finite Honda Systems And Supersingular Elliptic Curves.  He was also featured as an extra in Nova's The Proof.

His identical twin brother Keith Conrad, also a number theorist, is a professor at the University of Connecticut.

References

External links

Homepage at Stanford University
On the modularity of elliptic curves over Q - Proof of Taniyama-Shimura coauthored by Conrad.
 Brian Conrad, Fred Diamond, Richard Taylor: Modularity of certain potentially Barsotti-Tate Galois representations,  Journal of the American Mathematical Society 12 (1999), pp. 521–567. Also contains the proof
 C. Breuil, B. Conrad, F. Diamond, R. Taylor :  On the modularity of elliptic curves over Q: wild 3-adic exercises,  Journal of the American Mathematical Society 14 (2001), 843–939.

20th-century American mathematicians
21st-century  American mathematicians
Number theorists
Harvard University staff
Princeton University alumni
University of Michigan faculty
Scientists from New York City
1970 births
Living people
Harvard College alumni
Fermat's Last Theorem
Mathematicians from New York (state)
American identical twins
Recipients of the Presidential Early Career Award for Scientists and Engineers